Elena Dhont (born 27 March 1998) is a Belgian footballer who plays for Dutch Eredevisie team Twente, and the Belgium women's national football team.

Club career
Between 2013 and 2015, Dhont played for K.A.A. Gent in the BeNe League. After the dissolution of the BeNe League, she continued playing for Gent in the Belgian Women's Super League. In 2020, Dhont announced a move to Dutch Eredivisie club FC Twente. She was one of six players to leave Gent. In November 2020, Dhont broke her kneecap during a match with PSV. She was out injured for the remainder of the season. Her next appearance was for the Twente under-23s team in March 2022, and the next month, she made her first appearance for the senior team since 2020.

International career
Dhont has played for Belgium under-17s, Belgium under-19s, and the senior team.

In 2019, Dhont scored for Belgium in a 1–0 victory over the Republic of Ireland, and also the only goal in a 1–0 win against Nigeria at the 2019 Cyprus Women's Cup.  In 2020, Dhont was selected in the squad for the Algarve Cup. She was included in the provisional 33-player squad for UEFA Women's Euro 2022, and made four appearances in the tournament.

Personal life
Dhont is from Zaffelare, Belgium. She is a Royal Belgian Football Association ambassador for women's football.

Career statistics

Scores and results list Belgium's goal tally first, score column indicates score after each Dhont goal.

References

External links
 
 

1998 births
Living people
People from Lochristi
Belgian women's footballers
Belgium women's international footballers
Women's association football forwards
K.A.A. Gent (women) players
FC Twente (women) players
Expatriate women's footballers in the Netherlands
Eredivisie (women) players
Super League Vrouwenvoetbal players
BeNe League players
Footballers from East Flanders
UEFA Women's Euro 2022 players
Belgium women's youth international footballers